Ber'ano is a district located in Shabelle Zone which crosses Shebelle River in Ethiopia. It is home to a large number of agricultural resources and farmers.

Geography of Somalia